Bibian Norai (born 1 September 1967) is a Spanish pornographic actress. She won FICEB Ninfa Awards for Best Spanish Actress (The Fetish Garden) in 2003 and Best Director (Public) in 2004.

Norai was the artistic director of the Salon Erotico de Barcelona. She had been affiliated with the film festival and its predecessor for over twenty years, first as an actress near the beginning of her career and then in various aspects of its production after 2003. During her time, she created a section at the show dedicated to women consumers and producers. She resigned as artistic director in 2018 over what she saw was the decline of the show.

References

External links
 
 
 
 

1967 births
Living people
Spanish pornographic film actresses